= Season Ticket Basketball 2003 =

2002 video game

- Box art
- Developer(s): Brian Nichols
- Publisher(s): Infogrames
- Platform(s): PC
- Release: NA: Sep 10, 2002
- Genre(s): Sports; Simulation
- Mode(s): Single-player

Season Ticket Basketball 2003 is a basketball management simulation video game developed by Brian Nichols and published by Infogrames.

== Gameplay ==
Contrary to many sports video games, where the player controls athletes who compete in the sport, Season Ticket Basketball 2003 puts the player in the role of the franchise owner. The sport itself is not played, but rather, aspects of the business side of the sport are decided upon. The game allowed the player to run as many franchises as desired for an indefinite number of seasons as well as the importing of images into the game as team logos. Also, the game allowed multiple saved leagues at once and its season process included an all-star game, a draft, and a playoff for the league championship. Along with the various customization options provided to the player, there is an exhibition game mode where the player can go against the computer or simulate a game without actually witnessing the game unfold on-screen.

== Reception ==
The game received a score of 8.1 from GameSpot, concluding that "Few games of this type are so fulfilling, so lovingly designed with a real appreciation for both the sport in question and for sensible user interfaces. Solid play, authentic number crunching, dedication to the fine details, and online league support make this one of the best sports management titles on the market."

== See also ==
- Season Ticket Football 2003
