= Season Ticket Football 2003 =

2002 video game

- Boxart
- Developer: Dave Koch Sports
- Publisher: Infogrames
- Platform: PC
- Release: Aug 18, 2002
- Genres: Sports simulation
- Mode: Single-player

Season Ticket Football 2003 is an American football management simulation video game developed by Dave Koch Sports and published by Infogrames.

== Gameplay ==
Season Ticket Football 2003 differs from most sports video game titles in that it does not allow the player to athletically dictate the results of games, but rather from a 'behind-the-scenes' business aspect of the sport as a franchise owner, similar to its companion titles, Season Ticket Basketball 2003 and Season Ticket Baseball 2003.

== Reception ==
Season Ticket Football 2003 received a score of 1.8 from GameSpot, citing a vague and obscure interface, repeated run-time errors, and quoting "Season Ticket Football 2003 is the worst sort of sports management title. The Dave Koch Sports effort (best known online as Action! PC Football) is one of those curious amalgams of a migraine-inducing interface and relentless number crunching, a program so needlessly complex that you can't bring yourself to call it a game."

== See also ==
- Season Ticket Basketball 2003
